Bligh was an electoral district of the Legislative Assembly in the Australian state of New South Wales. It was created in 1962, partly replacing Electoral district of Paddington-Waverley and was an urban electorate, covering 13.03 km² and taking in the suburbs of Potts Point, Darling Point, Woolloomooloo, Elizabeth Bay, Rushcutters Bay, Edgecliff, Darlinghurst, Paddington, Surry Hills, Redfern, Darlington and part of Chippendale.  It was a highly diverse electorate, as it contained both some of the wealthiest suburbs of Sydney, along the edge of the harbour, as well as some of the city's most disadvantaged areas, such as those around Redfern. This had the effect of making Bligh a marginal seat, although as the wealthier suburbs outnumbered the poorer suburbs, it tended to be -leaning. Independent Clover Moore defeated the incumbent Liberal member Michael Yabsley in 1988 (Yabsley subsequently reentered Parliament in the Vaucluse by-election later that year) and held the seat until its abolition in 2007, when it was replaced by the electoral district of Sydney.

Members for Bligh

Election results

References

Former electoral districts of New South Wales
Constituencies established in 1962
Constituencies disestablished in 2007
1962 establishments in Australia
2007 disestablishments in Australia